The Building at 1617 Third Avenue in Columbus, Georgia was listed on the National Register of Historic Places in 1980.

Built around 1889, it is a Victorian shotgun cottage house, hence it is a one-story weatherboarded rectangular plan house upon a brick pier foundation.  It has a hipped roof and a central chimney.  Its porch, across the three-bay front facade, has chamfered columns with gingerbread brackets.

Its National Register listing was within a batch of numerous Columbus properties determined to be eligible consistent with a 1980 study of historic resources in Columbus.

See also
Building at 1619 Third Avenue, adjacent and similar

References

Shotgun architecture
National Register of Historic Places in Muscogee County, Georgia
Victorian architecture in Georgia (U.S. state)
Buildings and structures completed in 1889